Waukers Linn is a waterfall on Polharrow Burn in Dumfries and Galloway, Scotland.

See also
Waterfalls of Scotland

References

Waterfalls of Dumfries and Galloway